= Tumarguddi =

Coordinates: 15°57′N 74°40′E

- Village
- Interactive map of Tumarguddi
- Country: India
- State: Karnataka
- District: Belgaum

Languages
  - Official: Kannada
- Time zone: UTC+5:30 (IST)

Tumarguddi is a village in Belgaum district of Karnataka, India.
